Dame Louise Agnetha Lake-Tack  (born 26 July 1944) is a former Governor-General of Antigua and Barbuda. She was the first woman to hold the office.

Background and earlier career

Louise Lake-Tack was born in St Philip Parish, Antigua in 1944. She was educated at Freetown Government School before attending the Antigua Girls High School in St. John's. After graduating she emigrated to the United Kingdom where she studied nursing at Charing Cross Hospital. Following the completion of her studies, she worked first at the National Heart Hospital and later at the Harley Street Clinic.

Lake-Tack later studied and graduated in law and subsequently served as a magistrate at both Marylebone and Horseferry Magistrate Courts. She also sat at Pocock Street Crown Court and Middlesex Crown Court to hear appeal cases from the lower courts. She served as a member of the Antigua and Barbuda National Association (London) for the 24 years preceding her appointment as Governor-General.

Personal life
Lake-Tack is a widow and has two children.

Governor-General
She took office as Governor-General of Antigua and Barbuda on 17 July 2007. She was the first woman to hold the office. On 14 August 2014, she was replaced by Sir Rodney Williams, who took office as the 4th Governor-General of Antigua and Barbuda.

Controversy

Shortly before Dame Louise Lake-Tack retired from office, she under the powers of her office conferred certain national honours of Antigua and Barbuda on 19 people, including a knighthood on her own son and a medal for her gardener. These appointments were condemned as unlawful by the newly elected prime minister. The Governor-General derives powers under Section 22 of the national Constitution and acts as the Queen's representative with prerogative powers. The Governor-General is independent of the Prime Minister.

In making the honours, the Governor-General claimed that she acted under the prerogative powers. Further, the 2000 National Honours Act provided statutory authority for her independent nominations for the awards and  that Knighthoods can only be taken away by degradation warrant if the recipient acts in such a manner to bring the honour into disrepute. Dame Louise publicly explained the reasons for the honours; maintaining that the individuals whom she awarded had been invaluable to the office of Governor-General and consequently awarded.

Honours
On 16 October Lake-Tack was invested as Dame of the Venerable Order of St. John (DStJ), and on 13 November 2007 appointed as Dame Grand Cross of the Order of St. Michael and St. George (GCMG).

References

External links
Official Government Website

1944 births
Antigua and Barbuda emigrants to England
Antigua and Barbuda judges
Antigua and Barbuda women in politics
Dames Grand Cross of the Order of St Michael and St George
Dames of the Order of St John
Governors-General of Antigua and Barbuda
Living people
People from Saint Philip Parish, Antigua
20th-century judges
21st-century women politicians